Cabeza de Vaca is a 1991 Mexican film about the adventures of Álvar Núñez Cabeza de Vaca (c. 1490 – c. 1557), an early Spanish explorer, as he traversed what later became the American South. He was one of four survivors of the Narváez expedition and shipwreck. He became known as a shaman among the Native American tribes he encountered, which helped him survive.  His journey of a number of years began in 1528. After his return to Spain, he published his journal in 1542. The screenplay by Guillermo Sheridan and Nicolás Echevarría is based on this journal.

Directed by Nicolás Echevarría and starring Juan Diego, the film was entered into the 41st Berlin International Film Festival. The film was selected as the Mexican entry for the Best Foreign Language Film at the 63rd Academy Awards, but was not accepted as a nominee.

A DVD version was released in 2012.

Cast
 Juan Diego as Alvar Núñez Cabeza de Vaca
 Daniel Giménez Cacho as Dorantes
 Roberto Sosa as Cascabel / Araino
 Carlos Castañón as Castillo
 Gerardo Villarreal as Estevanico
 Roberto Cobo as Lozoya (as Roberto 'Calambres' Cobo)
 José Flores as Malacosa
 Eli 'Chupadera' Machuca as Sorcerer
 Farnesio de Bernal as Fray Suárez
 Josefina Echánove as Anciana Avavar
 Max Kerlow as Man in Armor
 Óscar Yoldi as Esquivel
 Beau Melanson as Pánfilo de Narváez

See also
 List of submissions to the 63rd Academy Awards for Best Foreign Language Film
 List of Mexican submissions for the Academy Award for Best Foreign Language Film

References

External links
 Cabeza de Vaca, Reviews at Rottentomatoes
 
 

1991 films
1990s action films
1990s adventure films
1990s biographical films
Mexican biographical films
1990s Spanish-language films
Films about conquistadors
Films directed by Nicolás Echevarría
Indigenous cinema in Latin America
Films set in the 1520s
Films set in the 1530s
Films set in the 1540s
Mexican action films
Films about castaways
Cultural depictions of explorers
Cultural depictions of Spanish men
1990s Mexican films